Public Opinion News Agency(often called RP News ) (Arabic: اذاعة الرأي العام) is an Iraqi  public radio station but mainly an Arabic-speaking station, broadcasting in many locations throughout the Middle East on AM and FM from Baghdad. It was founded in 2009.

History
Radio "RP News" started broadcasting in 2009, and was created by Iraqi Media Network.

Awards 
 Best radio website (2017) from Al Ghadeer International Festival

References

External links
 

2009 establishments in Iraq
Arabic-language radio stations
Radio in Iraq
Radio stations established in 2009
Mass media in Baghdad
Mass media in Iraq